TJ Tatran Krásno nad Kysucou is a Slovak football team, based in the town of Krásno nad Kysucou. The club was founded in 1925.

References

External links 
Official website 
Futbalnet profile 
at futbalovekluby.sk 

Football clubs in Slovakia
Association football clubs established in 1925
1925 establishments in Slovakia